Goryeo under Mongol rule refers to the rule of the Mongol Empire and the Mongol-led Yuan dynasty over the Korean Peninsula from about 1270 to 1356. After the Mongol invasions of Korea and the capitulation of the Korean Goryeo dynasty in the 13th century, Goryeo became a semi-autonomous vassal state and compulsory ally of the Yuan dynasty for about 80 years. It has been referred to as a "son-in-law kingdom in the Mongol empire." The ruling line of Goryeo, the House of Wang, was permitted to rule Korea as a vassal of the Yuan, which established the Zhengdong Province (征東行省; literally "Conquering the East") in Korea. Members of the Goryeo royal family were taken to Dadu, and typically married to spouses from the Yuan imperial house. As a result, princes who became monarchs of Goryeo during this period were effectively imperial sons in-law (khuregen). Yuan overlordship ended in the 1350s when the Yuan dynasty itself started to crumble and King Gongmin of Goryeo began to push the Yuan garrisons back.

History

Mongol invasions 

The Mongol Empire launched several invasions against Korea under Goryeo from 1231 to 1259. There were six major campaigns: 1231, 1232, 1235, 1238, 1247, 1253; between 1253 and 1258, the Mongols under Möngke Khan's general Jalairtai Qorchi launched four devastating invasions in the final successful campaign against Korea, at tremendous cost to civilian lives throughout the Korean Peninsula. The Mongols annexed the northern areas of Korean Peninsula after the invasions and incorporated them into their empire as Ssangseong Prefectures and Dongnyeong Prefectures. In March 1258, the dictator Choe Ui of the Goryeo military regime was assassinated by Kim Jun, ending the Choe military dictatorship of Korea; after this, scholars who had insisted on peace with Mongolia gained power. This party sent an envoy to the Mongols, and a peace treaty was contracted between the Mongol Empire and Goryeo, part of which stipulated that Korea was to accept vassaldom to the Mongol Empire. Some military officials who refused to surrender formed the Sambyeolcho Rebellion and resisted in the islands off the southern shore of the Korean Peninsula.

Status

After 1270, Goryeo became a "fully integrated client kingdom," however official protocol was that of a subordinate principality. It has also been called a "son-in-law kingdom in the Mongol empire" because starting with King Chungnyeol (r. 1274-1308), kings of Goryeo were married to Mongol Borjigid princesses and Goryeo princes were raised and educated at the Yuan court. Gongmin of Goryeo (r. 1351-1374) referred to Goryeo's relationship with the Genghisids as that between vassal and lord. In 1280, Goryeo was reorganized as the Zhengdong Branch Secretariat, which lasted until the end of the dynasty. The Goryeo prince served as the grand councilor (chengxiang) but the secretariat managers (pingzhang) were appointed by the Yuan court. In 1300, Manager Körgüz proposed abolishing Goryeo court ritual and official hierarchy to better fit its status as a province, but this proposal was rejected. The Mongols established several autonomous commands in Korea that remained outside the control of the Goryeo court. Part of Jeju Island was converted to a grazing area for Mongol cavalry stationed there but this area was returned to formal Goryeo control in 1294. Goryeo also regained formal control of Dongnyeong in 1290.

The darughachi were Mongolian resident commissioners sent to the Goryeo court. These commissioners, while nominally subordinate to the Goryeo king, were routinely supplied with provisions and were actively involved in the affairs of the Goryeo court. Mongol emperors dethroned Goryeo kings who dissatisfied them in 1298, 1313, 1321, 1330, 1332, 1343, and 1351.

Goryeo was lower ranked than Inner Asians who surrendered to the Mongols earlier. When the Mongols placed the Uighurs of the Kingdom of Qocho over the Koreans at the court the Korean King objected, then the Mongol Emperor Kublai Khan rebuked the Korean King, saying that the Uighur king of Qocho was ranked higher than the Karluk Kara-Khanid ruler, who in turn was ranked higher than the Korean King, who was ranked last, because the Uighurs surrendered to the Mongols first, the Karluks surrendered after the Uighurs, and the Koreans surrendered last, and that the Uighurs surrendered peacefully without violently resisting. Koreans (韓) were classified along with Northern Chinese, Khitan, Balhae and Jurchen people as "Han people."

Marriage 
Once the treaty was concluded and vassaldom established, intermarriage between the Koreans and Mongols was encouraged by the Mongol Empire. After the death of Wonjong in 1274, his successor Chungnyeol of Goryeo received Kublai's daughter Qutlugh-Kelmish as a wife, and his reign began a wholesale Mongolization of the Korean court that continued until the middle of the 14th century. On paper, the official protocol for Korea was that of a subordinate principality, and Korean rulers made lengthy stays at the Mongol Yuan court, both before and after their coronation. In addition, their Mongol wives, and even concubines, exerted great influence over Goryeo politics. For instance, Bayankhutag, Princess Gyeonghwa selected officials for posts within the Goryeo government. The Mongols and the Kingdom of Goryeo became linked via marriage and Goryeo became a quda (marriage alliance) state of the Yuan dynasty; monarchs of Goryeo during this period were effectively imperial sons in-law (khuregen). The effects of intermarriage on Mongol-Goryeo relations worked both ways: during the reign of Kublai Khan, King Chungnyeol of Goryeo married one of Kublai's daughters; later, a court lady from Korea called the Empress Gi became an empress through her marriage with Ukhaantu Khan, and her son, Biligtü Khan of the Northern Yuan dynasty, became a Mongol Khan. Furthermore, the kings of Goryeo held an important status within the Mongol imperial hierarchy, much like other important families of conquered or client states of the Mongol Empire (e.g. the Uyghurs, the Oirats, and Khongirad). 

The Mongols extracted tribute from throughout their empire. From Goryeo, they received gold, silver, cloth, grain, ginseng, and falcons. The tribute payments were a burden on Goryeo and subjugated polities in the empire. As with all parts of the Mongol Empire, Goryeo provided palace women, eunuchs, Buddhist monks, and other personnel to the Mongols. Korean concubines were procured by the Khan. One of them was Empress Gi, who, through her political command and incorporation of Korean females and eunuchs in the court, spread Korean clothing, food, and lifestyle in the capital. It became prestigious to marry Korean women among members of the Yuan elite. The entry of Korean women into the Mongol court was reciprocated by the entry of Mongol princesses into the Korean court, beginning with the marriage of Chungnyeol of Goryeo and a daughter of Kublai Khan; in total, 9 princesses of the Yuan court married into the Goryeo royal family.

Yuan outpost against Japan 
Militarily, following the 1259 peace treaty, Mongol ambitions on Japan resulted in two invasions of Japan. In both efforts, the Mongols directed Korean shipbuilding and militarization towards the amphibious assault of the Japanese coasts and pressed a large proportion of Korean naval and infantry forces into the service of Mongol military objectives. Korea supplied 770 fully manned ships and 5,000 soldiers in 1274 and 900 ships and 10,000 soldiers in 1281. Yuan officials and envoys took concubines and wives in Korea while they were stationed in Korea for the invasion of Japan. For a variety of reasons, both invasions failed. During the periods leading up to and during the invasions, Korea was effectively forced to serve as a Mongol military base. The Yuan dynasty paid for ships and soldiers in Goryeo with baochao paper money.

Aftermath 
The Goryeo dynasty survived under the Yuan until King Gongmin began to push the Mongolian garrisons of the Yuan back in the 1350s, when the Yuan dynasty faced the Red Turban Rebellion in China. Empress Gi and her eunuch Bak Bulhwa attempted a major coup of Northern China and Koryo. Goryeo incurred negative consequences as a result of the eunuch Bak Bulhwa's actions. Empress Gi intervened in Goryeo and her family contended with the Goryeo royal family; her family was purged by Gongmin of Goryeo in 1356. By 1356 Goryeo under King Gongmin regained its lost northern territories such as the Ssangseong Prefecture placed under the Liaoyang province by the Yuan. He also repulsed the Red Turban invasions of Goryeo in 1360. Empress Gi launched a failed Mongol invasion of Korea in 1364. However, even after the eventual expulsion of the Yuan dynasty from China in 1368, some Goryeo kings such as U still favored the Yuan, still a formidable power in the Mongolian Plateau as the Northern Yuan, over the Ming dynasty established by Han people. This changed with the overthrow of Goryeo in 1392 by Yi Seong-gye, founder of Joseon, who cut off relations with the Mongols.

See also
History of Korea
Mongol invasions of Japan
Manchuria under Yuan rule
Mongolia under Yuan rule
Tibet under Yuan rule
Yuan dynasty in Inner Asia
Mongolians in South Korea

References

Sources 

 

 

Yuan dynasty
Provinces of the Yuan dynasty
Goryeo
13th century in Korea
14th century in Korea